Eisenberg is a municipality in the Donnersbergkreis, in Rhineland-Palatinate, Germany. It is situated on the north-eastern edge of the Palatinate forest, approx. 20 km south-west of Worms.

Eisenberg is the seat of the Verbandsgemeinde ("collective municipality") Eisenberg.

Personalities

Sons and daughters of the city 

 Georg Fischer (1888-1963), politician (SPD)
 Josef Diehl (1898-1971), politician (SPD), long-time mayor of Eisenberg
 Walter Blankenheim (1926-2007) was a German pianist and teacher, born in Eisenberg, died in Saarbrücken (see Wikipedia page)

People who have worked in the city 
 Winfried Hirschberger (born 1945), from 1982 to 1985 city mayor
 Jaqueline Rauschkolb (born 1987), politician (SPD), parliamentary deputy since 2014, grew up in Eisenberg

References

Palatinate Forest
Donnersbergkreis